Alan Mac Clyde or Alan McClyde is the name used in the 1950s by the Paris-based publishers of some English-language erotica: Patrick Garnot of Pall Mall Press and Bronislaw Kaminsky, aka Bruno Durocher, of Week End Books both located in 5, rue Gît-le-Cœur, Paris. The pseudonym Alan Mac Clyde had previously been used by another author of French-language erotica in the 1930s.

Bibliography

First editions
 MacClyde, Alan, The Passionate Lash or The Revenge of Sir Hilary Garner, Pall Mall Press, 5, rue Git-le-Cœur, Paris. 17.5 x 11.5 cm. pp. 209. BnF: 
 McClyde, Alan [sic], The Passionate Lash or The Revenge of Sir Hilary Garner, 1958, Pall Mall Press, Paris. 16 x 11 cm. pp. 160. Gray and red wrappers. BL: LoC: KI:
 MacClyde, Alan, The Cruise of "The Bizarre", Week End Books, c. 1958. pp. 185. Pale green wrappers printed in black. BL:
 McClyde, Alan [sic], The Slaves of Elizabeth Fale,  n.p. Paris c.1958. Printed light yellow wrappers with canary yellow interior pages. 160pp.
 Mc Clyde, Alan [sic], S.O.S.O.: Society of Slave Owners, s.n., s.d. [c. 1950-60 ?]. 8vo. pp. 125. Plain white card in printed blue paper wraps.

American editions and reprints
 McClyde, Alan [sic], The Slaves of Elizabeth Fale, Gargoyle Press, 1968.  12mo (over 6¾"-7¾" tall). Pp. 218. Reprint of The Passionate Lash
 McClyde, Alan [sic], The Cruise of "The Bizarre", [Montreal?], Bizarre Pub. Co., 22 cm. pp. 185. LoC:
 McClyde, Alan, Susan, or the Ravaged Innocent Unveiled, Gargoyle Press, 1968. Pp. 219. Reprint of The Cruise of "The Bizarre"
 McClyde, Alan [sic], The Cruise of "The Bizarre", Collector’s Publications (Series no. 21223), Industry, CA, 1968 16 cm. Pp. 161+ads.
 MacClyde, Alan , The Calamities of Jane, New York, Grove Press, 1971?. pp. 155. 18 cm.  LoC:} KI: 823.8 M11122 c2 1971.

References

BDSM writers